Surajgarh Assembly constituency is one of constituencies of Rajasthan Legislative Assembly in the Jhunjhunu (Lok Sabha constituency).

Surajgarh Constituency covers all voters from Buhana tehsil and parts of Chirawa tehsil, which include Surajgarh Municipal Board, Baloda, Berla, Bhaothari, Dheengariya, Jakhod, Kakoda, Kidwana, Lakhoo, Lotiya and Mahpalwas of ILRC Surajgarh.

MLA

References

See also 
 Member of the Legislative Assembly (India)

Jhunjhunu district
Assembly constituencies of Rajasthan